Salman Alizade (born 1 December 1993) is an amateur Light flyweight boxer from Azerbaijan.

He who won silver at the 2010 Summer Youth Olympics, and gold at the 2011 European Amateur Boxing Championships.

At the 2013 European Amateur Boxing Championships Alizade won a Bronze Medal.

References

External links
The-Sports.org

Azerbaijani male boxers
Sportspeople from Baku
Light-flyweight boxers
1993 births
Living people
Boxers at the 2010 Summer Youth Olympics